"People" is a song by New Zealand group Mi-Sex, released in March 1980 as the lead single from their second studio album, Space Race (1980). The song peaked at number 3 in New Zealand and 6 in Australia.

Music video
The video showcases the band’s well honed combination of techno-pop and the more straight ahead rock’n’roll beloved of Australian pub audiences — with some visual special effects reserved for the future shock of the spoken segment.

Track listings
Australia/New Zealand 7" (BA 222652)
 "People" - 3:49	
 "Pages and Matches" - 2:29

Charts

Year-end charts

References

New Zealand songs
Mi-Sex songs
1980 singles
1980 songs
CBS Records singles